The 1916–17 season was the 18th season for FC Barcelona.

Season highlights
 Two players debuted with the team, and left their mark: Agustin Sancho and Emilio Sagi Liñán.
 The Garchitorena scandal exploded when FC Barcelona included a foreign player Juan Garchitorena in their lineup for the Catalan football championship, where foreigners were not allowed to play. Team RCD Espanyol claimed Torena had U.S. citizenship (although in all the confusion, it was later claimed he was Argentinian), since the Philippines was a territory of the United States at that time; but they only reported it after losing to Barcelona (3-0). A redo of all the matches including this player was ordered, but the club preferred to withdraw. Garchitorena ended up getting involved with cinema, moving to Hollywood and having various liaisons, including one with actress Myrna Loy. 
 On 17 June 1917 club founder Joan Gamper regained the presidency of the club for the third time.

Player roster

Results 

 The first six matches were counted as defeats due to illegal lineups.

External links

Season summary, daily, 1899–2008
Year-by-year results

References

FC Barcelona seasons
Barcelona